MOC-Floyd Valley Community School District is a rural public school district headquartered in Orange City, Iowa.

Most of the district is in Sioux County with a portion in O'Brien County. It serves Orange City, Alton, Hospers, Granville, and Maurice.

History
The district formed on July 1, 1992, with the merger of the Maurice-Orange City and Floyd Valley districts.

In 2020, the district proposed a bond to build a new, larger elementary school for $37 million. Each year, on average, until 2020 the elementary school enrollment increased by 18. It was scheduled for March 3, 2020. The measure was passed 63.46% to 36.54%; 60% was the required threshold.

Schools
Schools include:
 MOC-Floyd Valley High School (Orange City)
 MOC-Floyd Valley Middle School (Alton)
 Orange City Elementary School
 The current Orange City Elementary building opened in the early 1920s. As per the 2020 bond it will be rebuilt.
 Hospers Elementary School
 The current Hospers Elementary building opened in the late 1950s. As per the 2020 bond, the Hospers school will close with students attending Orange City.

MOC-Floyd Valley High School

Athletics
The Dutchmen and Lady Dutch are members of the Siouxland Conference, and participate in the following sports:
Football
Cross Country
Volleyball
(2-time State Champions - 2012, 2013)
Basketball
Girls' 2014 State Champions
Boys' 3-time State Champions (1988, 1989, 2005)
Wrestling
Golf
Soccer
Track and Field
 Boys' (2-time State Champions - 1961, 1973)
Baseball
Softball

Fine Arts
The "Pride of the Dutchmen Marching Band" is the marching band for MOC-Floyd Valley High School. The band competes regionally in Iowa, Nebraska, Minnesota and South Dakota. The band was Class A Regional Champion and a 6th place finalist band at the 2022 Bands of America Iowa Regional in Waukee, Iowa. The band has performed at many local and national parades, marching most recently at Universal Studios Florida and Disney’s Magic Kingdom in 2021, the Hollywood Christmas Parade in 2016 and in the Tournament of Roses Parade in Pasadena, CA in 2013. Each year, the Pride of the Dutchmen Marching Band marches at the Orange City Tulip Festival Parades held in May.

See also
List of school districts in Iowa
List of high schools in Iowa

References

External links
 MOC-Floyd Valley Community School District
 

School districts in Iowa
Education in Sioux County, Iowa
Education in O'Brien County, Iowa
1994 establishments in Iowa
School districts established in 1994